Two ships of the Royal Australian Navy (RAN) have been named HMAS Pirie, after the city of Port Pirie, South Australia.

 , a Bathurst-class corvette commissioned in 1942 and sold to the Turkish Navy in 1946
 , an Armidale-class patrol boat commissioned in 2006 and decommissioned in 2021.

Battle honours
Three battle honours were earned by the first HMAS Pirie, and are carried by all subsequent ships of the name:
 Pacific 1942–45
 New Guinea 1943–44
 Okinawa 1945

References

Royal Australian Navy ship names